Erlauf may refer to:
Erlauf (municipality), in the district of Melk in Lower Austria
Erlauf (river), of Lower Austria and Styria